Siegfried Gurschler (born 14 December 1925) is an Austrian former sports shooter. He competed in two events at the 1952 Summer Olympics.

References

External links
  

1925 births
Possibly living people
Austrian male sport shooters
Olympic shooters of Austria
Shooters at the 1952 Summer Olympics
Place of birth missing (living people)
20th-century Austrian people